This topic reveals a large number of triathlon events and their results for 2016.

2016 Summer Olympics (ITU)
 August 18 – 20: 2016 Summer Olympics in  Rio de Janeiro at Fort Copacabana
 Men's Elite winner:   Alistair Brownlee;   Jonny Brownlee;   Henri Schoeman
 Women's Elite winner:   Gwen Jorgensen;   Nicola Spirig;   Vicky Holland

2016 ITU World Triathlon Series
 March 4 & 5: ITU WTS #1 in  Abu Dhabi
 Men's Elite winner:  Mario Mola
 Women's Elite winner:  Jodie Stimpson
 April 9 & 10: ITU WTS #2 in  Gold Coast, Queensland
 Men's Elite winner:  Mario Mola
 Women's Elite winner:  Helen Jenkins
 April 24: ITU WTS #3 in  Cape Town
 Men's Elite winner:  Fernando Alarza
 Women's Elite winner:  Non Stanford
 May 14 & 15: ITU WTS #4 in  Yokohama
 Men's Elite winner:  Mario Mola
 Women's Elite winner:  Gwen Jorgensen
 June 11 & 12: ITU WTS #5 in  Leeds
 Men's Elite winner:  Alistair Brownlee
 Women's Elite winner:  Gwen Jorgensen
 July 2 & 3: ITU WTS #6 in  Stockholm
 Men's Elite winner:  Alistair Brownlee
 Women's Elite winner:  Flora Duffy
 July 16 & 17: ITU WTS #7 in  Hamburg
 Men's Elite winner:  Mario Mola
 Women's Elite winner:  Katie Zaferes
 September 3 & 4: ITU WTS #8 in  Edmonton
 Men's Elite winner:  Jonny Brownlee
 Women's Elite winner:  Summer Cook
 September 11 – 18: ITU WTS (#9) Grand Final in  Cozumel
 Men's Elite winner:  Henri Schoeman
 Women's Elite winner:  Flora Duffy
 Junior Men winner:  Austin Hindman
 Junior Women winner:  Taylor Knibb
 Men's U23 winner:  Jorik van Egdom
 Women's U23 winner:  Laura Lindemann

2016 ITU Triathlon World Cup
 March 12: ITU TWC #1 in  Mooloolaba, Queensland
 Men's Elite winner:  Mario Mola
 Women's Elite winner:  Jodie Stimpson
 April 3: ITU TWC #2 in  New Plymouth
 Men's Elite winner:  Richard Murray
 Women's Elite winner:  Gwen Jorgensen
 April 16: ITU TWC #3 in  Chengdu
 Men's Elite winner:  Rodrigo Gonzalez
 Women's Elite winner:  Summer Cook
 May 7 & 8: ITU TWC #4 in  Huatulco
 Men's Elite winner:  Etienne Diemunsch
 Women's Elite winner:  Jolanda Annen
 May 8: ITU TWC #5 in  Cagliari
 Men's Elite winner:  Kristian Blummenfelt
 Women's Elite winner:  India Lee
 July 9 & 10: ITU TWC #6 in  Tiszaújváros
 Men's Elite winner:  Dmitry Polyanski
 Women's Elite winner:  Renee Tomlin
 August 6 & 7: ITU TWC #7 in  Montreal
 Men's Elite winner:  Kristian Blummenfelt
 Women's Elite winner:  Flora Duffy
 September 25: ITU TWC #8 in  Salinas, Ecuador
 Men's Elite winner:  David Castro Fajardo
 Women's Elite winner:  Kirsten Kasper
 October 22: ITU TWC #9 in  Tongyeong
 Men's Elite winner:  Uxio Abuin Ares
 Women's Elite winner:  Summer Cook
 October 29: ITU TWC #10 (final) in  Miyazaki
 Men's Elite winner:  Uxio Abuin Ares
 Women's Elite winner:  Ai Ueda

World triathlon championships
 February 13 & 14: 2016 Zeltweg ITU Winter Triathlon World Championships in 
 Men's Elite winner:  Pavel Andreev
 Women's Elite winner:  Yulia Surikova
 Junior Men's winner:  Anton Matrusov
 Junior Women's winner:  Anna Swoboda
 Men's Under 23 winner:  Roman Vasin
 Women's Under 23 winner:  Sina Hinteregger
 June 4 & 5: 2016 Avilés ITU Duathlon World Championships in 
 Men's Elite winner:  Richard Murray
 Women's Elite winner:  Emma Pallant
 Junior Men's winner:  Alex Yee
 Junior Women's winner:  Delia Sclabas
 Men's Under 23 winner:  Jorik van Egdom
 Women's Under 23 winner:  Claudia Luna
 July 16 & 17: 2016 Hamburg ITU Triathlon Mixed Relay World Championships in 
 Winners: The  (Gwen Jorgensen, Ben Kanute, Kirsten Kasper, Joe Maloy)
 July 23 & 24: 2016 Rotterdam ITU Paratriathlon World Championships in the 
 Men's PT1 winner:  Jetze Plat
 Men's PT2 winner:  Andrew Lewis
 Men's PT3 winner:  Denis Kungurtcev
 Men's PT4 winner:  Martin Schulz
 Men's PT5 winner:  Aaron Scheidies
 Women's PT1 winner:  Kendall Gretsch
 Women's PT2 winner:  Allysa Seely
 Women's PT3 winner:  Manon Genest
 Women's PT4 winner:  Grace Norman
 Women's PT5 winner:  Alison Patrick
 August 7: 2016 Nyon FISU World University Triathlon Championship in 
 Men's Elite winner:  Grant Sheldon
 Women's Elite winner:  Yuko Takahashi
 September 4: 2016 Zofingen ITU Powerman Long Distance Duathlon World Championships in 
 Men's Elite winner:  Seppe Odeyn
 Women's Elite winner:  Emma Pooley
 September 11 – 18: 2016 Cozumel ITU Aquathlon World Championships in 
 Men's Elite winner:  Alistair Brownlee
 Women's Elite winner:  Mariya Shorets
 Junior Men's winner:  Michał Oliwa
 Junior Women's winner:  Elle Leahy
 Men's Under 23 winner:  Jonas Schomburg
 Women's Under 23 winner:  Anastasia Gorbunova
 September 24: 2016 Oklahoma City ITU Long Distance Triathlon World Championships in the 
 Men's Elite winner:  Sylvain Sudrie
 Women's Elite winner:  Jodie Swallow
 November 19 & 20: 2016 Snowy Mountains ITU Cross Triathlon World Championships in 
 Men's Elite winner:  Ruben Ruzafa
 Women's Elite winner:  Flora Duffy
 Junior Men's winner:  Michael Ferreira
 Junior Women's winner:  Laura May
 Men's Under 23 winner:  Brad Matthew Edwards
 Women's Under 23 winner:  Aneta Grabmullerova

Regional triathlon championships
 January 15 & 17: 2016 La Paz CAMTRI Triathlon American Cup and Junior South American Championships in 
 Men's Elite winner:  Luciano Taccone
 Women's Elite winner:  Romina Palacio Balena
 Junior Men's winner:  Javier Martín
 Junior Women's winner:  Andrea Garrido
 January 31: 2016 Mérida CAMTRI Triathlon American Cup and Iberoamerican Championships in 
 Men's Elite winner:  Irving Perez
 Women's Elite winner:  Cecilia Gabriela Perez Flores
 February 13 & 14: 2016 Havana CAMTRI Sprint Triathlon American Cup and Iberoamerican Championships in 
 Men's Elite winner:  Carlos Quinchara
 Women's Elite winner:  Camila Alonso
 February 13 & 14: 2016 Havana CAMTRI Middle Distance Triathlon Iberoamerican Championships in 
 Men's Elite winner:  Gustavo Rodriguez Iglesias
 Women's Elite winner:  Ellen Hart
 March 12: 2016 Sarasota CAMTRI Triathlon Junior North American Championships in 
 Junior Men winner:  Oliver Blecher
 Junior Women winner:  Laurin Thorne
 March 20: 2016 Valparaíso CAMTRI Triathlon American Cup and South American Championships in 
 Men's Elite winner:  Anton Ruanova
 Women's Elite winner:  Romina Biagioli
 April 1 & 2: 2016 Sharm el-Sheikh ATU Sprint Triathlon African Cup and Pan Arab Sprint Triathlon Championships in 
 Men's Elite winner:  László Tarnai
 Women's Elite winner:  Elena Maria Petrini
 Junior Men winner:  Abdulla Attiya
 Junior Women winner:  Basmala Elsalamony
 April 8: 2016 Sharm el-Sheikh ATU Duathlon African Championships and Pan Arab Duathlon Championships in 
 Men's Elite winner:  Moussa Karich
 Women's Elite winner:  Fatma Hagras
 Junior Men winner:  Kamal Atef
 Junior Women winner:  Suzy Soliman (default)
 Men's U23 winner:  Mohammad Jawhar
 Women's U23 winner:  Naira Mohamed
 April 8: 2016 Sharm el-Sheikh ATU Aquathlon African Championships and Pan Arab Aquathlon Championships in 
 Men's Elite winner:  Mohanad Yasser
 Women's Elite winner:  Basmala Elsalamony
 Junior Men winner:  Abdallah Abushabab
 Junior Women winner:  Kareena Othman
 Men's U23 winner:  Mohanad Yasser
 Women's U23 winner:  Basmala Elsalamony
 April 15 – 17: 2016 San Andrés CAMTRI Triathlon Junior Central American and Caribbean Championships in 
 Junior Men winner:  Bryan Fernando Mendoza Ramos
 Junior Women winner:  Raquel Solis Guerrero
 April 16 & 17: 2016 Pokhara ASTC South Asian Triathlon Championships in 
 Men's Elite winner:  Rudra Katuwal
 Women's Elite winner:  Sorojini Devi Thoudam
 June 11: 2016 Olimp ETU Balkan Triathlon Championships in 
 Men's Elite winner:  Ognjen Stojanović
 Women's Elite winner:  Ipek Oztosun
 June 25 & 26: 2016 Valga ETU Baltic Triathlon Championships in 
 Men's Elite winner:  Alberto Eugenio Casillas Garcia
 Women's Elite winner:  Paula-Brit Siimar
 August 27 & 28: 2016 Fredericia ETU Nordic Triathlon Championships in 
 Men's Elite winner:  Andreas Schilling
 Women's Elite winner:  Amanda Bohlin
 November 18: 2016 Aqaba ASTC West Asian Triathlon Championships in 
 Men's Elite winner:  Domen Dornik
 Women's Elite winner:  Zurine Rodriguez

European Triathlon Union (ETU)
 January 23: 2016 Otepää ETU Winter Triathlon European Championships in 
 Men's Elite winner:  Pavel Andreev
 Women's Elite winner:  Olga Parfinenko
 Men's Junior winner:  Anton Matrusov
 Women's Junior winner:  Merili Sirvel
 Men's U23 winner:  Roman Vasin
 Women's U23 winner:  Iuliia Baiguzova
 April 16 & 17: 2016 Kalkar ETU Duathlon European Championships in 
 Men's Elite winner:  Jorik van Egdom
 Women's Elite winner:  Giorgia Priarone
 Men's Junior winner:  Moritz Horn
 Women's Junior winner:  Lisa Tertsch
 Men's U23 winner:  Jorik van Egdom
 Women's U23 winner:  Sara Baumann
 April 23 & 24: 2016 Târgu Mureș ETU Cross Duathlon European Championships in 
 Men's Elite winner:  Xavier Jové Riart
 Women's Elite winner:  Margarita Fullana Riera
 Men's Junior winner:  Matus Kozlovsky
 Women's Junior winner:  Sofiya Pryyma
 Men's U23 winner:  Xavier Jové Riart
 Women's U23 winner:  Anastasija Krūmiņa (default)
 May 7 & 8: 2016 Copenhagen ETU Powerman Long Distance Duathlon European Championships in 
 Men's Elite winner:  Kenneth Vandendriessche
 Women's Elite winner:  Nina Brenn
 May 26 – 29: 2016 Lisbon ETU Triathlon European Championships in 
 Men's Elite winner:  Francisco Javier Gómez Noya
 Women's Elite winner:  India Lee
 Men's Junior winner:  Javier Lluch Perez
 Women's Junior winner:  Cassandre Beaugrand
 June 17 – 19: 2016 Burgas ETU Triathlon U23 European Championships in 
 Men's U23 winner:  David Castro Fajardo
 Women's U23 winner:  Angelica Olmo
 June 25: 2016 Vallée de Joux ETU Cross Triathlon European Championships in 
 Men's Elite winner:  Ruben Ruzafa
 Women's Elite winner:  Ludivine Dufour
 Men's Junior winner:  Filippo Pradella
 Women's Junior winner:  Marta Menditto
 Men's U23 winner:  Arthur Serrieres
 Women's U23 winner:  Sina Hinteregger
 June 25 & 26: 2016 Châteauroux ETU Aquathlon European Championships in 
 Men's Elite winner:  Oleksiy Syutkin
 Women's Elite winner:  Valentina Zapatrina
 Men's Junior winner:  Alexis Kardes
 Women's Junior winner:  Simona Simunkova
 Men's U23 winner:  Jiri Kalus
 Women's U23 winner:  Tereza Zimovjanova
 June 26: 2016 Châteauroux ETU Sprint Triathlon European Championships in 
 Men's Elite winner:  Vincent Luis
 Women's Elite winner:  Lucy Hall
 July 2 – 5: 2016 Tiszaújváros ETU Triathlon Youth European Championships Festival in 
 Men's Youth winner:  Vasco Vilaca
 Women's Youth winner:  Sif Bendix Madsen
 Youth 4 x Mixed Relay winners: 
 July 24: 2016 Poznań ETU Challenge Long Distance Triathlon European Championships in 
 Men's Elite winner:  Denis Sketako
 Women's Elite winner:  Ewa Bugdol
 September 3: 2016 Banyoles ETU Triathlon Clubs European Championships in 
 4 x Mixed Relay winners: 
 September 4: 2016 Walchsee ETU Challenge Middle Distance Triathlon European Championships in 
 Men's Elite winner:  Giulio Molinari
 Women's Elite winner:  Julia Gajer

Confederación Americana de Triathlon (CAMTRI)
 March 12 & 13: 2016 Sarasota CAMTRI Sprint Triathlon and Mixed Relay American Championships in the 
 Men's Elite winner:  Xavier Grenier-Talavera
 Women's Elite winner:  Kaitlin Donner
 4x Mixed Relay winners:  Team One (Kaitlin Donner, Eric Lagerstrom, Erin Jones, Jarrod Shoemaker)
 March 13: 2016 Sarasota CAMTRI Paratriathlon American Championships in the 
 Men's PT1 winner:  Krige Schabort
 Men's PT2 winner:  Mark Barr
 Men's PT3 winner:  Jorge Luis Fonseca
 Men's PT4 winner:  Chris Hammer
 Men's PT5 winner:  Aaron Scheidies
 Women's PT1 winner:  Kendall Gretsch
 Women's PT2 winner:  Allysa Seely
 Women's PT3 winner:  Andrea Walton
 Women's PT4 winner:  Grace Norman
 Women's PT5 winner:  Elizabeth Baker
 July 9: 2016 West Des Moines CAMTRI Triathlon U23 & Junior American Championships in the 
 Men's Junior winner:  Charles Paquet
 Women's Junior winner:  Taylor Knibb
 Men's U23 winner:  Cesar Saracho
 Women's U23 winner:  Vanesa de la Torre
 November 25 – 27: 2016 Buenos Aires CAMTRI Triathlon American Championship in 
 Men's Elite winner:  Luciano Taccone
 Women's Elite winner:  Luisa Baptista

Oceania Triathlon Union (OTU)
 February 20 & 21: 2016 Devonport OTU Paratriathlon Oceania Championships in 
 Note: No Men's PT3 and Women's PT2 events here.
 Men's PT1 winner:  Bill Chaffey
 Men's PT2 winner:  Brant Garvey
 Men's PT4 winner:  Joshua Kassulke
 Men's PT5 winner:  Jonathan Goerlach
 Women's PT1 winner:  Emily Tapp
 Women's PT3 winner:  Sally Pilbeam
 Women's PT4 winner:  Kate Doughty
 Women's PT5 winner:  Katie Kelly (default)
 March 19 & 20: 2016 Gisborne OTU Triathlon Oceania Championships in 
 Men's Elite winner:  Marcel Walkington
 Women's Elite winner:  Emma Moffatt
 Junior Men:  Matthew Hauser
 Junior Women:  Jessica Claxton
 Men's U23 winner:  Marcel Walkington
 Women's U23 winner:  Emma Jeffcoat
 Junior 4x mixed relay winners:  Team Four (Zoe Leahy, Kye Wylde, Sophie Malowiecki, Matthew Hauser)
 April 23 & 24: 2016 Penrith OTU Sprint Triathlon Oceania Championships in 
 Men's Elite winner:  Matthew Roberts
 Women's Elite winner:  Jaz Hedgeland
 Men's U23 winner:  Matthew Roberts
 Women's U23 winner:  Jaz Hedgeland

Asian Triathlon Confederation (ASTC)
 April 28 – May 1: 2016 Hatsukaichi ASTC Triathlon Asian Championships in 
 Men's Elite winner:  Hirokatsu Tayama
 Women's Elite winner:  Ai Ueda
 Men's Junior winner:  James Tan
 Women's Junior winner:  JEONG Hye-rim
 Men's U23 winner:  Ryousuke Maeda
 Women's U23 winner:  Hiraku Fukuoka
 April 28 – May 1: 2016 Hatsukaichi ASTC Paratriathlon Asian Championships in 
 Note: No Women's PT1 and PT3 events here.
 Men's PT1 winner:  Jumpei Kimura
 Men's PT2 winner:  Kenshiro Nakayama
 Men's PT3 winner:  WANG Jiachao
 Men's PT4 winner:  Keiichi Sato
 Men's PT5 winner:  Ryu Nakazawa
 Women's PT2 winner:  Yukako Hata (default)
 Women's PT4 winner:  Mami Tani (default)
 Women's PT5 winner:  Atsuko Yamada (default)

Africa Triathlon Union (ATU)
 March 12: 2016 Bloemfontein ATU Triathlon Junior African Championships in 
 Junior Men:  Ben de la Porte
 Junior Women:  Maude Elaine le Roux
 Youth Men:  Brett Elliott
 March 12: 2016 Bloemfontein ATU Paratriathlon African Championships in 
 Note: No Women's PT2 and PT5 events here.
 Men's PT1 winner:  Anton Swanepoel (default)
 Men's PT2 winner:  Mohamed Lahna (default)
 Men's PT3 winner:  Dylan da Silva 
 Men's PT4 winner:  Stan Andrews
 Men's PT5 winner:  David Jones (default)
 Women's PT1 winner:  Catherine van Staden (default)
 Women's PT3 winner:  Saskia van den Ouden (default)
 Women's PT4 winner:  Petra Lévay (default)
 March 20: 2016 Buffalo City ATU Triathlon African Championships in 
 Men's Elite winner:  Henri Schoeman
 Women's Elite winner:  Mari Rabie
 Men's U23 winner:  Wian Sullwald
 Women's U23 winner:  Alexander Quenet

2016 World Paratriathlon events
 March 19 & 20: WP #1 in  Buffalo City
 Note: No Women's PT1 and PT3 events here.
 Men's PT1 winner:  Giovanni Achenza
 Men's PT2 winner:  Ryan Taylor
 Men's PT3 winner:  Jorge Luis Fonseca
 Men's PT4 winner:  Yannick Bourseaux
 Men's PT5 winner:  Arnaud Grandjean
 Women's PT2 winner:  Elise Marc
 Women's PT4 winner:  Lauren Steadman
 Women's PT5 winner:  Alison Patrick
 April 24: WP #2 in  Penrith, New South Wales
 Men's PT1 winner:  Bill Chaffey
 Men's PT2 winner:  Andrew Lewis
 Men's PT3 winner:  Justin Godfrey
 Men's PT4 winner:  George Peasgood
 Men's PT5 winner:  Jonathan Goerlach
 Women's PT1 winner:  Emily Tapp
 Women's PT2 winner:  Sarah Reinertsen
 Women's PT3 winner:  Kerryn Harvey (default)
 Women's PT4 winner:  Kate Doughty
 Women's PT5 winner:  Elizabeth Baker
 May 14 & 15: WP #3 (Part of the fourth ITU World Triathlon Series event) in  Yokohama
 Note: No Women's PT3 event here.
 Men's PT1 winner:  Bill Chaffey
 Men's PT2 winner:  Stefan Loesler
 Men's PT3 winner:  Denis Kungurtcev
 Men's PT4 winner:  Stefan Daniel
 Men's PT5 winner:  Ryu Nakazawa
 Women's PT1 winner:  Mary Catherine Callahan (default)
 Women's PT2 winner:  Allysa Seely
 Women's PT4 winner:  Kate Doughty
 Women's PT5 winner:  Amy Dixon
 May 15: WP #4 in  Águilas
 Men's PT1 winner:  Geert Schipper
 Men's PT2 winner:  Michele Ferrarin
 Men's PT3 winner:  Alejandro Sánchez Palomero
 Men's PT4 winner:  Martin Schulz
 Men's PT5 winner:  Alen Kobilica
 Women's PT1 winner:  Eva María Moral Pedrero (default)
 Women's PT2 winner:  Sarah Reinertsen
 Women's PT3 winner:  Manon Genest
 Women's PT4 winner:  Chantal Givens
 Women's PT5 winner:  Melissa Reid
 June 5: WP #5 in  Strathclyde, Scotland
 Men's PT1 winner:  Jetze Plat
 Men's PT2 winner:  Geoffrey Wersy
 Men's PT3 winner:  Oliver Dreier
 Men's PT4 winner:  Chris Hammer
 Men's PT5 winner:  Jose Luis García Serrano
 Women's PT1 winner:  Lizzie Tench
 Women's PT2 winner:  Sarah Reinertsen
 Women's PT3 winner:  Nora Hansel (default)
 Women's PT4 winner:  Lauren Steadman
 Women's PT5 winner:  Catherine Walsh
 June 19: WP #6 (final) in  Besançon
 Note: No Women's PT1 event here.
 Men's PT1 winner:  Geert Schipper
 Men's PT2 winner:  Stéphane Bahier
 Men's PT3 winner:  Tojo Lazzari
 Men's PT4 winner:  Yannick Bourseaux
 Men's PT5 winner:  Arnaud Grandjean
 Women's PT2 winner:  Elise Marc
 Women's PT3 winner:  Manon Genest
 Women's PT4 winner:  Faye Mcclelland
 Women's PT5 winner:  Catherine Walsh

References

 
Triathlon by year